Philosophy of Miracle is the debut album by Russian singer Vitas, released in May 10th 2001. It is sometimes translated as Philosophy of a Miracle, Philosophy of Wonder, or Wonders of Philosophy. The album received widespread popularity in mid-2015 after "The 7th Element" (often memed as "Chum Drum Bedrum" and "Weird Russian Singer") and "Opera No. 2" gained popularity several years earlier. It has reportedly sold at least 3.5 million copies in China alone. All the songs were written or co-written by Vitas, with the exception of "Prelude" by Dmitri Plachkovsky. The album was recorded with many backing musicians including the Vienna Symphony Orchestra. Neon magazine described the album as "fresh, original, new and therefore interesting".

Several songs from this album featured in Vitas' Opera #... and Smile or Philosophy of Miracle concert programmes, the premiere of the latter earned him a record as the youngest artist to perform a solo concert at the State Kremlin Palace. A DVD of this concert was later released. One song from the album, "Opera #2", was released as a single and became hugely popular, earning the Russian Record best-selling single prize in three consecutive years, a Golden Gramophone award, and a People's Hit prize. According to an estimate from Gemini Sun records, "Opera #2" has been downloaded over 20 million times, with over 15 million downloads for the track "The 7th Element". The music video for "Opera #2" and the TV performance of "The 7th Element" have been forwarded frequently via the internet, accounting for much of Vitas' worldwide recognition.

The 12th track on the album is an early recording of "Opera #1" which comes from the studio sessions during Vitas' early career in his native town Odessa. A video for this track was filmed between 1998 and 1999, featuring a 19-year-old long-haired Vitas in a beach and a night club. The video was leaked by fans in May 2021.

Track listing

References

External links
Vitas official website (English version)

Vitas albums
2001 debut albums